Loreta Gulotta  (born  8 May 1987) is an Italian fencer. She represented her country at the 2016 Summer Olympics.

References

1987 births
Living people
Italian female fencers
Fencers at the 2016 Summer Olympics
Olympic fencers of Italy
21st-century Italian women